Nicholas Gleaves (born 2 January 1969) is an English actor and playwright.

Career
Gleaves's first theatre part was as an extra in Don Carlos at the Royal Exchange Theatre in Manchester. He did several plays there including the lead in Macbeth. When interviewed about this play, he said he never had the superstition that surrounded it, "...all that spitting and spinning round — it all seems like quite hard work".

He has been in many television shows since 1992; Gleaves was Rick Powell in the television drama series Playing the Field. He had the role of Ray Fairburn in Conviction. Conviction was filmed at Salford Lads' Club which delighted Gleaves because of the building's connection to The Smiths. In The Chase, he was the father Tom Bedford. In 2009, he said the idea for Survivors, in which he played the scientist Whitaker, was "great". He played DS Andy Roper in the first two series of Scott & Bailey. Of this role, he said, "I've done quite a few cop shows and as much as I enjoy testosterone, shouting at villains and all that, I really fell in love with this. As soon as I read it I saw something new and original. That was one of the reasons why I wanted to be involved because it was so different and very believable."

Gleaves has also started to write shows for radio.

List of credits

Television

Film

Theatre

His theatre credits include:
The Front Page. This Sam Mendes production at the Donmar in 1997 had Gleaves as the newshound Wilson.
 Alan Jeffcote in Hindle Wakes by Stanley Houghton at the Royal Exchange, Manchester. Directed by Helena Kaut-Howson (1996 and 1998).
 On the Shore of the Wide World. In 2005, Gleaves portrayed the father Peter, first at the Royal Exchange Theatre and then at the Royal National Theatre. He was nominated for a MEN Theatre Award in the category of best actor in a leading role.
 Macbeth. He played the lead in 2009 production at the Royal Exchange Theatre.
Dr Faustus. 2010 saw him take on the role of Mephistophilis. 
Chair. In this 2012 production, Gleaves's part is that of a soldier. Lyric Theatre Studio, Hammersmith.
The Saga of Noggin the Nog. He played the nasty Uncle Nogbad in spring 2013.

Personal life
Originally from the Halliwell area of Bolton, Lancashire, England, Gleaves attended Sharples School from 1980 to 1985. After completing his schooling, his mother made him attend a play and this sparked his interest in acting. He is a fan of The Smiths and long time supporter of Bolton Wanderers. Gleaves is married to actress Lesley Sharp. They have two sons and reside in London.

References

External links

1969 births
Living people
English male television actors
Actors from Bolton
20th-century English male actors
21st-century English male actors
English dramatists and playwrights